Deaths during the Mahsa Amini protests refer to those people who were killed due to Iran's nationwide protests of 2022, triggered by the death of 22-year-old Kurdish Iranian Jina Mahsa Amini on September 16, 2022, in a Tehran hospital under suspicious circumstances.

The Guidance Patrol, the religious morality police of Iran's government, arrested Amini for allegedly not wearing the hijab in accordance with government standards. The Law Enforcement Command of the Islamic Republic of Iran stated that she had a heart attack at a police station, collapsed, and fell into a coma before being transferred to a hospital. However, eyewitnesses, including women who were detained with Amini, reported that she was severely beaten and that she died as a result of police brutality, which was denied by the Iranian authorities. The assertions of police brutality, in addition to leaked medical scans, led some observers to believe Amini had a cerebral hemorrhage or stroke due to head injuries received after her arrest.

Documentation 
During the protests that followed, many young women and men, including children, were shot or killed in the street or executed in prison without trial, or died as a result of mistreatment and torture. The perpetrators are usually male members of the religious police, the paramilitary Basijis, the Iranian Revolutionary Guards Corps (IRGC) or prison guards. The killings and mistreatments are being carried out systematically on orders from the regime to use ruthless violence to suppress the protests and deter the population from further participation. They are internationally regarded as serious human rights crimes.

Since the beginning of the protests, human rights organizations, news agencies specializing in Iran, quality media, and domestic and foreign Iranian opposition groups have continuously collected testimonies from inside Iran, verified the information as much as possible, and then provided reports on the reliably identified fatalities and essential information about their deaths released. Documentaries on this come from the news agencies IranWire, the Human Rights Activists News Agency (HRANA) and Iran International, Amnesty International, the Hengaw Organization for Human Rights (Hengaw), Iran Human Rights (IHR), the Iran Human Rights Monitor (IHRM) and the National Council of Resistance of Iran (NCRI). Media such as The New York Times, Washington Post, The Guardian, Der Spiegel, Der Tagesspiegel, Die Zeit and others have published many names of victims in the context of their reports on Iran.

Statistics 
As of October 5, 2022, HRANA registered 342 civil protest gatherings in all 31 provinces of Iran, including 266 street protests in 105 major cities and 76 student protests in all 69 universities in the country. The police and Basijis used tear gas, rubber and metal bullets and live ammunition to disperse the gatherings, killing hundreds of unarmed people. In the first three weeks, HRANA initially identified 200 fatalities, including 18 children and adolescents, largely through analysis of video footage and testimonies received from Iran.

By the end of October 2022, NCRI announced 280 identified protesters were killed in the protests and put the total death toll at 450 so far, similar to IHRM. By November 2, 2022, IHR registered at least 277 people killed in the protests and in custody, including 40 children. IHR is investigating numerous unconfirmed reports of further killings and also expects dozens of executions of those arrested on arbitrary death sentences. As of November 5, 2022, at least 314 people have been killed in protests in Iran, including 47 minors and 38 security forces, according to HRANA and more than 14,000 were arrested. Following a massacre by regime forces in Khash on November 4, 2022, NCRI reported 324 identified fatalities. By December 17, 2022, at least 469 people have been killed. 374 of the deaths were men and 63 of the deaths were children and 32 were women. 39 protesters are also at risk of execution

According to the Iranian government, around 200 people have died during the protest. Human rights activists assume a high number of unreported deaths. A reason for this is that the Iranian regime arbitrarily arrests or kidnaps thousands of people, kills many without a process of law, and instead of handing over their bodies to their relatives, disappears them. Media research and criminal investigations are forbidden under the dictatorship of Iran, and are being done illegally and then associated with great risks and danger for witnesses, investigative journalists, human rights activists and lawyers.

List of victims 
The documentation from HRANA (1), IranWire (2), Der Spiegel (3), Amnesty International (4), Iran Human Rights (5) and NCRI (6) regularly includes the names of the fatalities and, where ascertained, their ages and the date, place and cause of death. The following list presents the most important published information in chronological order.

See also 
 Death sentences during the Mahsa Amini protests

References

External links
 Victims of Iranprotests 2022. Iranprotests.com
 The Fallen for Freedom. NCRI Women Committee (first of ten documentation pages so far)
 Liste der Menschen, die bei den Protesten im Iran seit 16. September 2022 getötet wurden. Labournet, 10. November 2022



 
Presidency of Ebrahim Raisi
Lists of deaths in 2022
Iran history-related lists
History of the Islamic Republic of Iran